Blondelia is a genus of flies in the family Tachinidae.

Species
Blondelia albopilosa (Curran, 1926)
Blondelia arizonica (Townsend, 1915)
Blondelia eufitchiae (Townsend, 1892)
Blondelia flaviventris (Macquart, 1844)
Blondelia hyphantriae (Tothill, 1922)
Blondelia inclusa (Hartig, 1838)
Blondelia nigripes (Fallén, 1810)
Blondelia obconica (Walker, 1853)
Blondelia paradexoides (Townsend, 1926)
Blondelia polita (Townsend, 1919)
Blondelia prudens (Curran, 1934)
Blondelia pulchella (Curran, 1934)
Blondelia siamensis (Baranov, 1938)
Blondelia sodalis (Wulp, 1890)
Blondelia tibialis Mesnil, 1962
Blondelia angusticornis Herting, 1987
Blondelia verticale (Curran, 1934)
Blondelia vexillaria (Villeneuve, 1922)

References

Tachinidae genera
Diptera of South America
Diptera of North America
Diptera of Europe
Diptera of Asia
Exoristinae
Taxa named by Jean-Baptiste Robineau-Desvoidy